The Weissman score is a performance metric for lossless compression applications. It was developed by Tsachy Weissman, a professor at Stanford University, and Vinith Misra, a graduate student, at the request of producers for HBO's television series Silicon Valley, a television show about a fictional tech start-up working on a data compression algorithm. It compares both required time and compression ratio of measured applications, with those of a de facto standard according to the data type.

The formula is the following; where r is the compression ratio, T is the time required to compress, the overlined ones are the same metrics for a standard compressor, and alpha is a scaling constant.

Weissman score has been used by Daniel Reiter Horn  and Mehant Baid of Dropbox to explain real-world work on lossless compression. According to the authors it "favors compression speed over ratio in most cases."

Example
This example shows the score for the data of the Hutter Prize, using the paq8f as a standard and 1 as the scaling constant.

Limitations
Although the value is relative to the standards against which it is compared, the unit used to measure the times changes the score (see examples 1 and 2). This is a consequence of the requirement that the argument of the logarithmic function must be dimensionless. The multiplier also can't have a numeric value of 1 or less, because the logarithm of 1 is 0 (examples 3 and 4), and the logarithm of any value less than 1 is negative (examples 5 and 6); that would result in scores of value 0 (even with changes), undefined, or negative (even if better than positive).

Examples

See also
Benchmark
Coding theory
Information theory
Phred quality score

References

Benchmarks (computing)
Data compression
Silicon Valley (TV series)
Software metrics